The Electronic Entertainment Expo 1995, commonly known as E3 1995, was the first Electronic Entertainment Expo held. The event took place at the Los Angeles Convention Center from May 11–13, 1995, with 50,000 total attendees. Highlights of the 1995 show include Sony's announcement of the PlayStation's release date and pricing, Sega's surprise launch of the Sega Saturn, and Nintendo's showcase of the Virtual Boy console.

Organization
Prior to 1995, the video game industry used the Consumer Electronics Show (CES) as their primary trade show venue. In the years leading up to 1995, the video game industry was usually delegated to an outdoor section of CES, which were not ideal conditions for promoting products. The International Digital Software Association (IDSA), later renamed to the Entertainment Software Association (ESA), approached CES and its head Gary J. Shapiro with their grievances about the conditions they had at CES. As CES did not consider video games as part of consumer electronics, they were unwilling to alter how they would involve video games. This led IDSA to consider starting their own show. Pat Ferrell of GamePro, a publication owned by International Data Group (IDG) with experience in running trade shows like MacWorld, began the process of organizing such a show. Tom Kalinske, then the CEO of Sega of America, was a prime motivator in establishing a new show, believing CES did not have the video game industry's best interests at heart, and had found previously that running a Sega-only event was highly regarded by retailers and media alike. IDSA also recognized that by holding its own trade show, it would have a means to finance its organization. Ferrell came up with the show's name "Electronic Entertainment Expo" with the idea that it could be treated as "E cubed", however, in conversations with exhibitors, they felt this approach was unnecessary, and that the "E3" moniker was simple and just as effective.

CES overheard these plans, and quickly proposed their own CES-branded video game-only trade show. IDSA and CES approached the larger video game companies to pitch their versions of the show. Many of the younger companies, like Electronic Arts, desired the approach offered by IDSA, including the potential to own part of the show by becoming members of the IDSA, over what the CES offered. The primary holdout to IDSA's plan was Nintendo, who believed their hardware should be treated as consumer electronics and thus should be part of CES. During these negotiations, the CES reserved space in Philadelphia for the show during the month of May, which Ferrell stated was "prime time" for retailers to prepare for late-year/holiday sales. The IDSA had yet reserved space, and quickly got in contact with the Los Angeles Convention Center (LACC), finding that the space was free for the same dates that CES has planned, effectively forcing potential exhibitors to pick one show or the other. They had chosen Los Angeles as it would be a single-flight travel for those companies coming from Japan, in contrast to Philadelphia. Over the next several weeks, prior to either event having to put down their non-refundable reservation fees, IDSA made an aggressive push to get exhibitors for their show, securing more than 180 vendors. Of the major video game companies, only Nintendo and Microsoft had held out, still undecided which show to attend. Soon after this push, Shapiro contacted Ferrell and told him he "won"; CES dropped the plans for their Philadelphia event. The same day, Nintendo and Microsoft reached out to Ferrell to discuss exhibition plans at his event.

Event

At this point, most of the floor space at the LACC was taken up by the early exhibitors. Nintendo had desired space in the larger South Hall, but the early adopters like Sony and Sega had already claimed it. Ferrell made sure that Nintendo still had prime floor space in the West Hall, moving the registration areas to the West Hall so that attendees had to pass Nintendo's booth. Ferrell also had to book extra floor space at a dozen different hotels near the convention center due to demand.

Among elements of the first E3 that would continue into future events were large press conferences by the major companies (here, Sony, Sega, and Nintendo) showcasing their up-and-coming hardware and software. Notably, at point, both Sega and Sony were ready to introduce new hardware for Western releases, the Sega Saturn and the PlayStation, respectively. Sega's conference was first, and while Kalinske announced that the Saturn would be immediately available in stores, they were notified soon after that supplies were more limited than thought. During Sony's presentation, after covering many of the PlayStation's games, Steve Race, the lead for bringing the PlayStation to the United States, came on stage, said "two-ninety-nine" and then left, revealing that the price of the PlayStation was  less than that of the Saturn. The moment is considered one of the first proverbial mic drop moments in E3's history, and would continue a trend as each company would try to outdo others at these press events.

While official attendance numbers were at 55,000, Ferrell estimated that an additional 10,000 people were able to get in; the event was meant to be limited to professionals in the industry, retailers, and press, but believes that many got in with showing a seemingly-relevant business card.

Exhibitions

Nintendo
The Virtual Boy, Nintendo's intermediary console released between the Super Nintendo Entertainment System and the Nintendo 64, was showcased prominently. The Nintendo 64, then known as the Ultra 64, was presented in a near-final state of development. Games on display included Donkey Kong Country 2: Diddy's Kong Quest, EarthBound, and Killer Instinct.

Sega
Prior to E3 1995, the Sega Saturn had already released in Japan, and was slated for a September 2, 1995, American release. On the first day of E3 1995, Sega CEO Tom Kalinske gave a keynote presentation in which he revealed the Saturn's release price of US$399, and described the features of the console. Kalinske also revealed that, due to "high consumer demand", Sega had already shipped 30,000 Saturns to Toys "R" Us, Babbage's, Electronics Boutique, and Software Etc. for immediate release.

Sony
Sony announced the price and release date for the then-upcoming PlayStation. Prior to Sony's keynote conference, Sega announced the US$399 retail price for the newly-released Sega Saturn; capitalizing on the opportunity, SCEA President Steve Race made a single, brief statement at Sony's conference: "$299". The audience cheered as Race walked away from the lectern.

List of notable exhibitors
This is a list of major video game exhibitors who made appearances at E3 1995:

List of featured games 
This is a list of notable titles that appeared by their developers or publishers at E3 1995:

References

Bibliography 

1995 in Los Angeles
1995 in video gaming
1995
May 1995 events in the United States